SC Makhachkala was a Russian football team from Makhachkala. It was founded in 2019 by three people (including coach Gadzhi Gadzhiyev) and licensed for third-tier Russian Professional Football League for the 2019–20 season. Before the 2021–22 season, the club was replaced by restored FC Dynamo Makhachkala.

History

Domestic history

References

Association football clubs established in 2019
Football clubs in Russia
Sport in Makhachkala
2019 establishments in Russia